Urban Sketchers (USk) is a global community of artists that practice drawing on location in cities, towns and villages they live in or travel to. 
The Urban Sketchers movement was started on Flickr in 2007 by journalist Gabriel Campanario. In 2009 Campanario established Urban Sketchers as a nonprofit organization (501 (c) (3) tax-exempt). The Urban Sketchers Manifesto has been translated into several languages.

The USk motto is “We show the world, one drawing at a time!”

History 

Urban Sketchers started as a group on image sharing site, [Flickr], in 2007. The Urban Sketchers founder Gabriel (Gabi) Campanario is a Spanish journalist and illustrator living in Seattle. He is a journalist for The Seattle Times where he contributes as an artist and a writer to both the printed edition as well as blogs. As more and more artists began to submit and share their drawings online, Campanario started a group to support and promote journalistic drawing depicting real life as it happens in front of the artist.

A year later in 2008 Campanario created the Urban Sketchers blog. Participation in the Urban Sketchers blog is by invitation and is limited to a hundred artists. The term Urban Sketchers Correspondent was created. Correspondents are invited by Campanario and commit to contribute journalistic sketches on a regular basis. The sketches are accompanied by stories providing a background for the sketch: when and where the sketch was created and some details about content – words and narrative that go with pictures. The Urban Sketchers blog gained popularity between 2008 and the present, attracting hundreds and soon thousands of visitors daily.

In December 2009, Campanario established Urban Sketchers as a nonprofit organization (501 (c) (3) tax-exempt). A board of directors was elected. The organization's task is to raise the artistic, storytelling and educational value of location drawing, promoting its practice and connecting people around the world who draw on location where they live and travel.

Activities 
Urban Sketchers has a manifesto which reads:
 We draw on location, indoors or out, capturing what we see from direct observation.	 
 Our drawings tell the story of our surroundings, the places we live and where we travel.	
 Our drawings are a record of time and place.	
 We are truthful to the scenes we witness.	
 We use any kind of media and cherish our individual styles.	
 We support each other and draw together. 	
 We share our drawings online.	
 We show the world, one drawing at a time.

Sketching
Urban Sketchers is a diverse group of people united by a passion for sketching. Discussions, for example about supplies and materials, take place when sketchers meet in real life or virtually.

Sketching in public creates opportunities for interaction. The majority of these interactions are positive and good-natured. In some instances, sketching in a café has produced a free coffee from a proprietor, and on a rare occasion sketching produced an invitation to sketch a cultural event that otherwise would be closed to an outsider. For example, a group of aspiring musicians, Flon Flon en Musette,  were performing a street concert that was documented by an Urban Sketcher who happened to be on site. The sketch then made it onto the face of the group's compilation CD and the sketcher was invited to a private concert.

In 2011 Campanario published a book, The Art of Urban Sketching, highlighting hundreds of the best Urban Sketchers members' work.

Symposiums 
Urban Sketchers organization organizes Urban Sketchers Symposiums. These are festive gatherings of artists, where for 3 days sketchers draw on location, attend numerous workshops, panel discussions, lectures, meet each other in person and draw.

The 1st Urban Sketchers Symposium was hosted in Portland, Oregon, USA July 29 – 31, 2010.
The 2nd Urban Sketchers Symposium was hosted in Lisbon, Portugal on July 21–23, 2011. It was attended by 200 people.
The 3rd Urban Sketchers Symposium was hosted in Santo Domingo, Dominican Republic, July 12 – 14, 2012 
The 4th Urban Sketchers Symposium was hosted in Barcelona, July 11–13, 2013.
The 5th Urban Sketchers Symposium was hosted in Paraty, Brazil, August 27–30, 2014.
The 6th Urban Sketchers Symposium was hosted in Singapore, July 22–25, 2015.
The 7th Urban Sketchers Symposium was hosted in Manchester, England, July 27–30, 2016.
The 8th Urban Sketchers Symposium was hosted in Chicago, Illinois, USA, July 26–29, 2017.
The 9th Urban Sketchers Symposium was hosted in Porto, Portugal, July 17–21, 2018.
The 10th Urban Sketchers Symposium was hosted in Amsterdam, Netherlands, July 24–27, 2019.
The 11th Urban Sketchers Symposium will be hosted in Hong Kong, April 8–11, 2020.  However, due to the Pandemic, the 2020 symposium has been canceled 
2021 & 2021 symposium canceled 
The 11th Urban Sketchers Symposium will be hosted in Auckland, New Zealand, April 19-22, 2023.

Workshops 

Artists who contribute to Urban Sketchers can host workshops for sketching enthusiasts around the world. The workshops aim to teach skills useful to the practice of urban sketching. Workshops can cover a variety of topics, such as perspective, panoramas, and people, and take place in the urban environment appropriate for the topic.

Communities 

Urban Sketchers created many regional communities. Correspondents of the original Urban Sketchers blog and Flickr group organized local sketchers and number of local sketching groups were started. Other grass roots leaders started groups and brought them under Urban Sketchers umbrella.

Regional Urban Sketchers groups function similar to the main global group. All embrace the vision of the Urban Sketchers Manifesto as leading guidelines, while each group maintains its local and cultural individuality. Many groups have their own blogs where correspondents are invited based on local criteria, Facebook and Flickr groups where all are welcome.

Urban Sketchers communities are active in many countries of Europe, in North and South America and Asia.

References 

 ↑ "Urban Sketchers FAQ". Retrieved on February 6, 2013.
 ↑ "About Urban Sketchers". Retrieved on February 6, 2013.
 ↑ "Urban Sketchers 1st International Symposium 2012 - Portland". Retrieved on February 6, 2013.
 ↑ "Urban Sketchers 2nd International Symposium 2011 - Lisboa". Retrieved on February 6, 2013.
 ↑ "Urban Sketchers 3rd International Symposium 2012 - Santo Domingo". Retrieved on February 6, 2013.
 ↑ "Urban Sketchers 4th International Symposium 2013 - Barcelona". Retrieved on February 6, 2013.

External links 

 
 San Francisco is Sketchy -- And, For Once, This Is a Good Thing, San Francisco Weekly
 Sketcher captures Auckland snapshots, The Aucklander, New Zealand
 Drawing group makes collaborative effort of showing Memphis to world, The Commercial Appeal. Memphis
 Meet Omar Jaramillo Traverso, The Independent. Canada
 An Urban Sketcher's Guide to Helsinki, Stockholm, Tallinn, Turku and Porvoo, Finland
 Málaga, una de las cuatro ciudades españolas representantes del movimiento Urban Sketchers en el mundo, Europa Press News Agency. Spain
 Cómo mirar a través de un lápiz, El País. Spain
 Il mondo raccontato con la matita, Il Corriere de la Sera. Italy
 Artistas que toman el pulso a Málaga, Diario Sur, Spain 
 Portland, OR Urban Sketchers
Urban Sketchers Hong Kong 速寫香港
 Diari de Girona, October 2015, Urban Sketchers Girona featured
 Urban Sketchers North Portugal was featured in the newspaper when the group sketched in Gondifelos
 The New Paper, July 27, 2015. "Sketching Singapore in its Actual State," an article about the Urban Sketchers Symposium
 Via Libre, June 25, 2015. Urban Sketchers Málaga's exhibit is featured
 Modern Art Paris Pompidou Center Library's magazine, April 2015. Urban Sketchers France is featured.
 Premeira Pagina, March 23, 2015. Urban Sketchers Brazil is featured.
 Kulturplatz, Swiss National Television, March 11, 2015. Urban Sketchers Switzerland is featured, including Andre Sandmann talking about and showing the USk blog.
 Stuttgarter-Zeitung, March 10, 2015. Urban Sketchers Stuttgart is featured.
 The Record, March 6, 2015. Kitchener-Waterloo Urban Sketchers is featured.
 SUR, March 2, 2015. Urban Sketchers Malaga is featured.
 Creative Bloq, Feb. 20, 2015. Article about the 2013 Urban Sketchers Symposium in Barcelona.
 The Seattle Greenlaker, Feb. 26, 2015. Seattle (USA) urban sketcher Steve Reddy is featured with his sketches of local coffee shops and houses.
 "'Urban Sketchers' draw San Jose," Feb. 18, 2015. Urban Sketchers Costa Rica is featured in the English-language online newspaper.
 La Nacion, Feb. 22, 2015. Urban Sketchers Costa Rica is featured.
 “Urban sketcher returns to share tricks of trade," The Examiner, Feb. 14, 2015. Sydney (Australia) urban sketcher Liz Steel is featured in the Launceston, Tasmania, newspaper.
 Top Channel, Feb. 4, 2015. Urban Sketchers Albania is featured in a major TV program.
 Teletica, Jan. 28, 2015. Urban Sketchers Costa Rica is featured on this major TV station.
 "Life captured in sketch pad," St. Paul Star Tribune, Jan. 5, 2015. St. Paul (USA) sketchers Ken and Roberta Avidor talk about Urban Sketchers and their car-free, bike-commuting lifestyle.
 "Tacoma’s Urban Sketchers share in a community that goes way beyond Pierce County," The News Tribune, Jan. 2, 2015. Urban Sketchers Tacoma (USA) organizers Frances Buckmaster, Rom LaVerdiere, Kate Buike and Mark Ryan are interviewed.

Arts organizations established in 2007
International artist groups and collectives